XHECU-FM is a radio station on 91.7 FM in Los Mochis, Sinaloa. It is owned by Grupo Radio Centro and is known as La Rancherita.

History
XECU-AM 1470 received its concession on January 6, 1951. The 250-watt station was owned by Luis Pérez Gómez until 1977, when it was acquired by Radio Local de la Provincia, S.A. de C.V. The current concessionaire picked up XECU in 1994 and moved it to 1450 kHz, with a power of 10 kW day and 1 kW night, by way of two technical authorizations in 1997 and 1999.

In 2011, XECU moved to FM as XHECU-FM 91.7.

In May 2016, Grupo Radio México exited Los Mochis and transferred operation of its stations to Radiorama. All of GRM's former stations transitioned to Radiorama formats, including XHECU, which had previously carried the La Z format. GRC returned to Los Mochis in February 2019, but this station did not change formats, and La Z returned on XHCW-FM instead.

References

Radio stations in Sinaloa